In This Tricky Life is a 2001 film directed by Beatriz Flores Silva. It was Uruguay's submission to the 74th Academy Awards for the Academy Award for Best Foreign Language Film, but was not accepted as a nominee. The film was awarded the 'Golden Columbus' at the Huelva Ibero-American Film Festival. An international co-production among companies from Uruguay, Belgium, Spain and Cuba, the film was produced by BFS Producciones, Saga Film, Avalon Productions and ICAIC.

It is based on the novel El huevo de la serpiente by journalist María Urruzola, whose investigations exposed an Uruguayan sex trafficking network in 1992.

Cast 
  as Elisa
  as Plácido el Cara
  as Marcelo
 Andrea Fantoni as Lulú
 Rodrigo Speranza as Marcos

See also

Cinema of Uruguay
List of submissions to the 74th Academy Awards for Best Foreign Language Film
List of Uruguayan submissions for the Academy Award for Best International Feature Film

References

External links

 Tricky Life

2001 films
Uruguayan comedy-drama films
Belgian comedy-drama films
Spanish comedy-drama films
Cuban comedy-drama films
2001 comedy-drama films
Films set in Montevideo
Films set in Barcelona
Films about prostitution
Prostitution in Uruguay
Works about prostitution in Spain
Avalon films
2000s Spanish films